The Nogales Port of Entry evolved over time, rather than being planned.  When an international fence divided Nogales in the early 20th century, vehicles were inspected at a gate at Grand Avenue, trains were inspected just east of there, and pedestrians were inspected further to the east at Morley Avenue.  A small tile-roofed inspection station was completed in 1931 and was expanded in 1949.  Substantial renovations were performed in 2011.

In 2011, the Morley Gate facility was renovated to improve throughput and to provide more space and better lighting.  On busy days, over 10,000 people enter the United States through Morley Gate.  It is one of only four land border pedestrian-only crossing in the United States, the others are the Boquillas Port of Entry in Big Bend National Park in Texas, the Cross Border Xpress at the Tijuana International Airport, and the PedWest component of the San Ysidro Port of Entry.

See also
 List of Mexico–United States border crossings
 List of Canada–United States border crossings

References

Mexico–United States border crossings
1920s establishments in Arizona
Buildings and structures in Santa Cruz County, Arizona